Xuzhou or Xu Prefecture was a zhou (prefecture) in imperial China centering on modern Xuchang in Henan, China. It existed (intermittently) from 581 to 1913.

Geography
The administrative region of Xuzhou in the Tang dynasty is in central Henan. It probably includes parts of modern: 
Under the administration of Xuchang:
Xuchang
Xuchang County
Yanling County
Changge
Under the administration of Luohe:
Luohe
Linying County
Wuyang County
Under the administration of Pingdingshan:
Wugang
Under the administration of Zhoukou:
Fugou County

References
 

Prefectures of the Sui dynasty
Prefectures of the Tang dynasty
Prefectures of the Song dynasty
Prefectures of the Jin dynasty (1115–1234)
Prefectures of Later Liang (Five Dynasties)
Prefectures of Later Han (Five Dynasties)
Prefectures of Later Jin (Five Dynasties)
Prefectures of Later Tang
Prefectures of Later Zhou
Former prefectures in Henan
Prefectures of the Yuan dynasty
Subprefectures of the Ming dynasty
Departments of the Qing dynasty